SS Duncan L. Clinch was a Liberty ship built in the United States during World War II. She was named after Duncan L. Clinch, an American army officer and a commander during the First Seminole War and Second Seminole Wars. He also served in the United States House of Representatives, representing Georgia.

Construction
Duncan L. Clinch was laid down on 22 August 1944, under a Maritime Commission (MARCOM) contract, MC hull 2378, by J.A. Jones Construction, Brunswick, Georgia; she was sponsored by Mrs. Harry B. Vickers, and launched on 6 October 1944.

History
She was allocated to American Export Lines, on 20 October 1944. She was declared a constructive total loss (CTL) the same day.

References

Bibliography

 
 
 
 
 

 

Liberty ships
Ships built in Brunswick, Georgia
1944 ships
Ships sunk by mines
Maritime incidents in December 1945